UEI may refer to:

Organizations
 Unidad Especial de Intervención ("Special Intervention Unit"), the emergency response unit of the Spanish Guardia Civil
 UEI College, a career education school in California, US
 Universal Electronics Inc, an American manufacture of electronic remote control and sensing products

Other uses
 Unified Emulator Interface, a component of the software Eclipse